Thorness may refer to the following places in England:

Great Thorness, hamlet on the Isle of Wight
Little Thorness, hamlet on the Isle of Wight
Thorness Bay, bay on the Isle of Wight